Nicolas-Edme Roret (29 May 1797 Vendeuvre-sur-Barse Département  – 18 June 1860, Paris) was a French editor and publisher known for an important series of manuals (Manuels) and encyclopaedias.

Sources 
 Articles and reviews:
 Bulletin des Bibliothèques de France : 1997 - Paris, t. 42, n° 02.
 Seminars and colloquia:
Le Vitrail et les traités du Moyen Âge à nos jours. Corpus Vitrearum. XXIIIe colloque international. Tours 3-7 Juillet 2006.

French editors
French publishers (people)
1797 births
1860 deaths
19th-century French people
19th-century publishers (people)